My Number may refer to:

"My Number" (Foals song), 2012 song by British rock band Foals
" My Number" (Major Lazer and Bad Royale song), song by Major Lazer and Bad Royale
My Number: The Anthology, 2001 album by English band Girl
My Number (Japan), national identification number in Japan